This is a list of the National Register of Historic Places listings in Sleeping Bear Dunes National Lakeshore.

This is intended to be a complete list of the properties and districts on the National Register of Historic Places in Sleeping Bear Dunes National Lakeshore, Michigan, United States.  The locations of National Register properties and districts for which the latitude and longitude coordinates are included below, may be seen in a Google map.

There are eight properties and districts listed on the National Register in the park, one of which is a National Historic Landmark..

Current listings 

|}

See also 
 National Register of Historic Places listings in Leelanau County, Michigan
 National Register of Historic Places listings in Michigan

References 

Sleeping Bear Dunes National Lakeshore